The Women's 400 metre Hurdles at the 2000 Summer Olympics as part of the athletics programme were held at Stadium Australia on Sunday 24 September, Monday 25 September and Wednesday 27 September 2000.

The top two runners in each of the initial five heats automatically qualified for the semifinals. The next six fastest runners from across the heats also qualified. Those 16 runners competed in 2 heats in the semifinals, with the top three runners from each heat qualifying for the finals. The next two fastest runners from across the heats also qualified.

Records

Medalists

Results
All times shown are in seconds.
 Q denotes qualification by place in heat.
 q denotes qualification by overall place.
 DNS denotes did not start.
 DNF denotes did not finish.
 DQ denotes disqualification.
 NR denotes national record.
 AR denotes area/continental record.
 OR denotes Olympic record.
 WR denotes world record.
 PB denotes personal best.
 SB denotes season best.

Qualifying heats

Round 1 

Overall

Semi-finals

Semi-Finals- Overall

Final

References

External links
Official Report of the 2000 Sydney Summer Olympics

Hurdles
400 metres hurdles at the Olympics
2000 in women's athletics
Women's events at the 2000 Summer Olympics